The National Agency for Science and Engineering Infrastructure (NASENI) was established in 1992 by The Nigerian Federal Government of the recommendations of the White Paper Committee on the 1991 Report of a 150-member National Committee on Engineering Infrastructure comprising scientists, engineers, administrators, federal and state civil servants, economists, lawyers, bankers and industrialists.

Engr. Prof. Mohammed Sani Haruna is the executive vice chairman and chief executive of the agency in Abuja, Nigeria.
The president, Goodluck Jonathan, approved the reconstitution of the governing board of the National Agency for Science and Engineering Infrastructure (NASENI) with himself as the chairman. This was announced on 26 April 2013 in a statement signed by the Secretary to the Government of the Federation (SGF), Senator Anyim Pius Anyim.

NASENI, by its mandate and scope of operation is the Nigerian only purpose-built agency designed to conduct developmental work in the areas of manufacturing, and as such, it is capable of coordinating the proliferation of technologies developed either within or outside of its Centers including patents obtained. Technologies developed in the areas of spares, components and systems engineering are to be transferred to entrepreneurs for the production of goods and services. Nigeria can have the benefit of a rapid technological development by strengthening NASENI

NASENI operates mainly through her Development Institutes. Each of the institutes has a unique mandate of Engineering Infrastructural development.
In August 2010 the agency said it had completed plans to establish centres of excellence and research on material science in nine universities in the Niger Delta region.
The agency has produced science kits for secondary schools, which it will distribute nationwide if funding is available.
NASENI has completed a 7.5 Megawatts Solar Panel Manufacturing Plant in Abuja and a 10KW Hydro Power Plant at Ketti Site in Abuja.

See also
Olusegun Adewoye

See also

References

Science and technology in Nigeria
Government agencies established in 1992
Government of Nigeria
1992 establishments in Nigeria